Dasht-e Sefid may refer to:
 Dasht-e Sefid, Afghanistan
 Dasht-e Sefid, Iran